Salix saxatilis is a willow species described by Porphir Kiril Nicolai Stepanowitsch Turczaninow.

Range
It is present in central Siberia, the Russian Far East (including Sakhalin), and Mongolia.

References 

saxatilis
Taxa named by Nikolai Turczaninow
Plants described in 1854
Flora of Mongolia
Flora of Siberia